The Parti Negara ( also spelled Party Negara) was a Malay-based political party which was formed by former leaders of the Independence of Malaya Party (IMP) in 1953, and formally launched in February 1954. It was founded by Dato Sir Onn Jaafar, the first president of the United Malays National Organisation (UMNO), after losing an internal power struggle.

The party, which was constitutionally multi-ethnic, sought to create a niche for itself as a third force in the late fifties and early sixties but it failed miserably. The party did not gain significant support within the Malay community, and was derided by the UMNO-led  Alliance Party for its alleged chauvinism. The only parliamentary seat Parti Negara ever won was in the 1959 general elections in Terengganu, by Onn himself.

With the death of Onn in 1962, Parti Negara eventuallyfizzled out.  The seat that Onn won was won back by the Alliance in the subsequent by-election.

General election results

State election results

References

1953 establishments in Malaya
1962 disestablishments in Malaya
Political parties established in 1953
Political parties disestablished in 1962
Defunct political parties in Malaysia